The Borden-Pond House is a historic house at 40 Laurel Street in Worcester, Massachusetts.  Built about 1856 but probably not completed until 1861, it is a prominent early example of Second Empire architecture, and one of a small number of stone villas to survive (out of a larger number built) in the neighborhood.  Lucius Pond, its second owner, was an important local machinist.  The house was listed on the National Register of Historic Places in 1980.

Description and history

The Borden-Pond House stands in a residential area overlooking Interstate 290 on Worcester's east side, at the northwest corner of Laurel and Edward Streets.  It is a three-story stone structure, set on a stone foundation partially exposed by the steeply sloping lot.  The lower two stories of the main block are stone, with a cornice and roof skirt separating them from the third floor, which is framed in wood and finished in clapboards.  The house originally had a mansard roof.  A two-story ell extends to the rear; it is stone on the first floor and wood-frame on the second, with a gabled roof.  The house is a rare survivor from a period when a number of stone villas were built in this area; most of them have been demolished.

Construction on the house began c.1856–59, probably by John Borden, a mason and its first resident.  According to local lore, Borden could not afford to finisht the building, and sold it to Lucius Pond in 1861. Pond was a leading local industrialist, who helped invent the Ellsworth repeating rifle. Pond was director of a local bank when rumors of its insolvency led to his flight in 1875.  He was arrested in San Francisco, California, attempting to gain passage on a ship to Australia.  Pond was convicted of forging bank notes, and spent seven years in prison.

See also
National Register of Historic Places listings in eastern Worcester, Massachusetts

References

Houses in Worcester, Massachusetts
Second Empire architecture in Massachusetts
Houses completed in 1856
National Register of Historic Places in Worcester, Massachusetts
Houses on the National Register of Historic Places in Worcester County, Massachusetts